INS Ambuda is a self-propelled water carrier barge built by Vipul shipyard Ltd (a subsidiary of ABG Shipyard Ltd) in  Surat, Gujarat for the Indian Navy.

Description
The auxiliary ship is 50 metres (164 ft 1 in) long, displaces 930 tonnes and has capacity for 500 tonnes of water. Ambuda has accommodation for 20 crew members and a galley or corridor kitchen facility. It has tank gauging systems, fire fighting equipment and carries a rigid inflatable boat. It has sea-going capability and carries all essential communication and navigation equipment.

INS Ambuda (IR no. 35823) is one of the five water barges built by Vipul Shipyard as per the contract concluded in February 2006. It was commissioned on 11 October 2010 by Commodore Ajay Kumar Sinha, Chief Staff Officer (Technical), Southern Naval Command at South Jetty, Naval Base.
It is named after a previous auxiliary vessel,  which served the Indian Navy for more than four decades and was decommissioned in February 2007.

Specifications
Gross weight: 598 tonnes
Displacement: 1042 tonnes
Overall length: 50.2 meters
Draught (max): 2.9 meters
Main engine: 1342 kW
Auxiliary generator: 1 x 36 kW 415 V 50 Hz AC; 2 x 86 kW 415 V 50 Hz AC

References

External links
 Sainik Samachar - Archives

Auxiliary ships of the Indian Navy